The 2009–10 Czech Extraliga season was the 17th season of the Czech Extraliga since its creation after the breakup of Czechoslovakia and the Czechoslovak First Ice Hockey League in 1993. In the regular season, Plzeň 1929 finished atop the league, Roman Červenka led the league in points and assists, and Petr Ton led the league in goals.

Team overview

Regular season

Standings 

Key
(C) = Playoff champions; (Q) = Qualified to playoffs; (RP) = Relegation playoff; (O) = Relegation playoff winner; (R) = Relegated.

Season summary 

The regular season consisted of 52 games for each team. Every team plays each of the other 13 teams four times, twice at home and twice on the road. Each game is worth three points in the standings. A game won in regulation nets the victor three points and the loser none. A game the ends in a tie at the end of regulation goes into overtime and, if necessary, a shootout. In an overtime or shootout game, the winner earns two points while the loser is awarded one point.

Playoffs

Bracket 

The playoff bracket is not a fixed bracket. Like the intraconference bracket in the NHL, the matchups are adjusted in each successive round in order to place the top-ranked team against the bottom-ranked team.

Playoff summary 

At the end of the regular season, the seventh through tenth-placed teams played in a best-of-five, preliminary playoff round. In the preliminary round Bílí Tygři Liberec defeated České Budějovice and Slavia Prague defeated Litvínov, both series going the 5-game distance. Liberec was then paired against Plzeň, and Slavia were paired against Zlín. Other first round matchups included Vítkovice–Sparta and Pardubice–Třinec.

The quarterfinal round saw two major upsets as the preliminary round winners knocked off the two highest-seeded teams from the regular season. Eighth-seeded Liberec knocked off top seed Plzeň in six games, 4–2, capped off by a 7–2 victory in game 6. The other first round upset saw Slavia knock off Zlín, also in six games and in front of their home crowd. Third-seeded Pardubice, after dropping the first game at home, ran off four straight victories to defeat Třinec 4–1. The only first round series to go the seven-game distance saw Vitkovice win at home to hold off Sparta.

In the semifinal round, Pardubice, the highest-remaining seed, were placed against Liberec, and Vitkovice were paired against Slavia.

Relegation

Play-out round

The bottom four teams from the regular season – Karlovy Vary, Kometa Brno, Mladá Boleslav, Kladno – were placed in a "play-out" relegation group. The group is structured like a mini-season in which each of the four teams played each of the other four times, twice at home and twice on the road, the same as the regular season format.  The results from the regular season standings are retained, and the additional relegation round match results are added to the table in order to determine which team is relegated to the Czech First League. Mladá Boleslav won only two of their twelve relegation round games, one in regulation and one in a shootout, and faced the 1. národní hokejová liga winner KLH Chomutov in best-of-seven series.

Play-off round

Mladá Boleslav were paired against KLH Chomutov, playoff winners of the 2009-10 playoffs of the 1. národní hokejová liga, with the winner of the best of seven series earning a place in the 2010–11 Czech Extraliga season. Mladá Boleslav won the series 4–1 and retained their position in the Extraliga.

References

External links 

 

2009-10
Czech
1